WSWT (106.9 FM, branded as "Mix 106.9") is a commercial radio station broadcasting an adult contemporary radio format, switching to Christmas music for much of November and December.  It is licensed to Peoria, Illinois, and is owned by Midwest Communications, Inc.  The radio studios and offices are on Fulton Street in Peoria.

WSWT has an effective radiated power (ERP) of 50,000 watts, the current maximum for Illinois radio stations.  The transmitter is on Grosenbach Road in Washington, Illinois.

History

The station signed on the air in 1964 as WIRL-FM.  It was the FM counterpart to WIRL 1290 AM.  It has since changed call signs to WIVC, WUHN and then to the current WSWT. For many years, it aired a beautiful music format, calling itself "W-Sweet" to go along with its call letters.  The station played quarter hour sweeps of soft, instrumental cover versions of popular songs. Walter Thurman was a longtime announcer at the station. Beginning in the 1980s the station gradually evolved into a soft adult contemporary sound and then to the more upbeat adult contemporary format that is the format today.

On December 22, 2014, WSWT announced it would rebrand from "Today's Lite Rock 107" to "Mix 106.9" after Christmas as part of its "New Year, New Name" campaign. That returned the heritage brand to the market for the first time since September 2007, when WXMP flipped to oldies as WHPI and rebranded as "Hippie Radio". This is the fourth incarnation for the "Mix" branding in Peoria: it originated as WMXP in 1994 on 93.3, after a seven-year absence, it resurfaced on 105.7 in 2003, and then moved to 101.1 in 2006 before the callsign and format were dropped the following year. The rebrand officially took place on the 26th. Shortly after the rebrand, the station dropped all-80s music from its weekend schedule, and shifted its non-Christmas playlist to Hot AC.

On February 4, 2019, Alpha Media announced that it was selling its Peoria cluster to Midwest Communications for $21.6 million. The sale closed on April 30, 2019.

On December 26, 2019, WSWT changed its slogan to "Your Life. Your Music.", and also adopted a new logo.

Previous logos

References

External links

"The Peoria Plague" on Archive.org — a radio drama that aired on the station in the early 1970s

SWT
Mainstream adult contemporary radio stations in the United States
Radio stations established in 1965
Midwest Communications radio stations